Langdon is a town in Sullivan County, New Hampshire, United States. The population was 651 at the 2020 census.

History 

First settled in 1773 by Seth Walker, Langdon was incorporated on January 11, 1787, when it was named after Governor John Langdon. The town is home to the Prentiss Bridge, the shortest covered bridge in New Hampshire.

Geography
Drained by the Cold River and its tributary Great Brook, Langdon lies within the Connecticut River watershed.

Adjacent municipalities
 Charlestown, New Hampshire (north)
 Acworth, New Hampshire (east)
 Alstead, New Hampshire (southeast)
 Walpole, New Hampshire (southwest)

Demographics

As of the census of 2000, there were 586 people, 237 households, and 174 families residing in the town. The population density was 36.0 people per square mile (13.9/km2). There were 269 housing units at an average density of 16.5 per square mile (6.4/km2). The racial makeup of the town was 99.66% White, 0.17% from other races, and 0.17% from two or more races. Hispanic or Latino of any race were 0.17% of the population.

There were 237 households, out of which 29.5% had children under the age of 18 living with them, 65.4% were married couples living together, 5.5% had a female householder with no husband present, and 26.2% were non-families. 21.1% of all households were made up of individuals, and 8.4% had someone living alone who was 65 years of age or older. The average household size was 2.47 and the average family size was 2.85.

In the town, the population was spread out, with 21.3% under the age of 18, 5.3% from 18 to 24, 30.2% from 25 to 44, 31.2% from 45 to 64, and 11.9% who were 65 years of age or older. The median age was 41 years. For every 100 females, there were 113.1 males. For every 100 females age 18 and over, there were 105.8 males.

The median income for a household in the town was $42,083, and the median income for a family was $43,125. Males had a median income of $33,750 versus $24,444 for females. The per capita income for the town was $24,572. About 3.3% of families and 3.8% of the population were below the poverty line, including none of those under age 18 and 12.3% of those age 65 or over.

Site of interest
 Prentiss Bridge – New Hampshire's smallest covered bridge

References

Further reading
 A. J. Coolidge & J. B. Mansfield, A History and Description of New England; Boston, Massachusetts 1859

External links
 
 New Hampshire Economic and Labor Market Information Bureau Profile

 
Towns in Sullivan County, New Hampshire
Populated places established in 1787
Towns in New Hampshire